Pennsylvania Route 408 (PA 408) is a  state highway located in Crawford County, Pennsylvania.  The western terminus is at US 6/US 19/PA 86 in Cambridge Springs.  The eastern terminus is at PA 8 in Hydetown.

Route description

PA 408 begins at an intersection with US 6/US 19 and PA 86 in the borough of Cambridge Springs, heading east-southeast on two-lane undivided Church Street and immediately crossing a Western New York and Pennsylvania Railroad line. The road passes businesses before entering residential areas. The route continues into Cambridge Township and becomes an unnamed road as it heads into agricultural areas with some homes. Upon heading into Rockdale Township, PA 408 makes a turn to the south prior to curving southeast again through more farmland with some woods and residences. The road enters Richmond Township, where it curves to the south and heads through more forested areas with some farm fields and homes. PA 408 turns west to form a short concurrency with PA 77 before heading south again. Farther south, the route makes a turn to the east and passes more farms, woods, and residences. The road continues into Steuben Township prior to coming into the borough of Townville, where it turns to the southeast. In this borough, the route runs past several homes and a few businesses. PA 408 crosses back into Steuben Township and heads back into rural areas of farmland and woodland, soon coming into Troy Township. In this area, the road intersects PA 428 and passes through more rural areas, turning more to the east. The route enters Oil Creek Township and heads into forests, soon coming into the borough of Hydetown. PA 408 curves northeast and crosses the Oil Creek, passing farm fields before entering residential areas and turning southeast onto Main Street. The route comes to its eastern terminus at an intersection with PA 8.

Major intersections

PA 408 Alternate Truck

Pennsylvania Route 408 Alternate Truck was a truck route around a weight-restricted bridge over the Thompson Creek on which trucks over 33 tons and combination loads over 40 tons were prohibited.  The route followed PA 77, PA 89, and PA 8.  It was signed in 2013. The bridge was reconstructed in 2016, effectively deleting the route.

See also

References

External links

Pennsylvania Highways: PA 408

408
Transportation in Crawford County, Pennsylvania